Holovanivsk Raion is a raion (district) of Kirovohrad Oblast in central Ukraine. The administrative center of the raion is the urban-type settlement of Holovanivsk. Its population is 

On 18 July 2020, as part of the administrative reform of Ukraine, the number of raions of Kirovohrad Oblast was reduced to four, and the area of Holovanivsk Raion was significantly expanded. Four abolished raions, Blahovishchenske, Haivoron, Novoarkhanhelsk, and Vilshanka Raions, were merged into Holovanivsk Raion. The January 2020 estimate of the raion population was

Subdivisions

Current
After the reform in July 2020, the raion consisted of 10 hromadas:
 Blahovishchenske urban hromada with the administration in the city of Blahovishchenske, transferred from Blahovishchenske Raion;
 Haivoron urban hromada with the administration in the city of Haivoron, transferred from Haivoron Raion; 
 Holovanivsk settlement hromada with the administration in urban-type settlement of Holovanivsk, retained from Holovanivsk Raion;
 Nadlak rural hromada with the administration in the selo of Nadlak, transferred from Novoarkhanhelsk Raion;
 Novoarkhanhelsk settlement hromada with the administration in the urban-type settlement of Novoarkhanhelsk, transferred from Novoarkhanhelsk Raion;
 Perehonivka rural hromada with the administration in the selo of Perehonivka, retained from Holovanivsk Raion;
 Pidvysoke rural hromada with the administration in the selo of Pidvysoke, transferred from Novoarkhanhelsk Raion;
 Pobuzke settlement hromada with the administration in the urban-type settlement of Pobuzke, retained from Holovanivsk Raion;
 Vilshanka settlement hromada with the administration in the urban-type settlement of Vilshanka, transferred from Vilshanka Raion;
 Zavallia settlement hromada with the administration in the urban-type settlement of Zavallia, transferred from Haivoron Raion.

Before 2020

Before the 2020 reform, the raion consisted of three hromadas:
 Holovanivsk settlement hromada with the administration in Holovanivsk;
 Perehonivka rural hromada with the administration in  Perehonivka;
 Pobuzke settlement hromada with the administration in  Pobuzke.

References

Raions of Kirovohrad Oblast
1923 establishments in Ukraine